Jurgen Van de Walle (born 9 February 1977, in Eernegem) is a Belgian former professional road bicycle racer, who competed as a professional between 1999 and 2013. Over his career, Van de Walle competed for the Palmans,  (twice),  and  squads.

Van de Walle retired at the end of the 2013 season, after fifteen seasons as a professional.

Major results

2000
 1st, Stage 1, Circuito Montañés
2001
 6th Druivenkoers Overijse
 7th Tour du Doubs
 9th Omloop van de Westkust
 10th Stadsprijs Geraardsbergen
2002
 10th Schynberg-Rundfahrt
2003
 2nd Overall Tour de China
 6th Overall Étoile de Bessèges
 6th GP Citta di Rio Saliceto e Correggio
2004
 5th Paris–Bourges
 6th Cholet-Pays de Loire
 9th Grand Prix de Denain
2005
 5th Overall Volta ao Algarve
 8th Overall Tour of Britain
 9th Subida al Naranco
2006
 2nd Overall, Ster Elektrotoer
 3rd Overall, Tour du Haut Var
 4th Overall Circuit Franco-Belge
 4th Grand Prix of Aargau Canton
 8th Grand Prix d'Isbergues
2007
 7th Overall Tour du Poitou-Charentes
2008
 1st, Stage 1 (TTT), Tour of Qatar
 5th Omloop van het Houtland
 8th Overall Tour of California
2009
 1st, Halle–Ingooigem
2010
 1st, Halle–Ingooigem
 3rd, Brabantse Pijl
2013
 3rd Ruddervoorde Koerse

References

External links

Belgian male cyclists
Living people
1977 births
Sportspeople from West Flanders
People from Ichtegem